Tinny is alternative spelling of tinnie, a slang term with a variety of tin-related meanings.

Tinny or Tinnie may also refer to:

People
Tinny (musician) (born 1982), Ghanaian rapper
Tinny Durrell, bassist of The Lemming, a Dutch glam rock band
 nickname of Clinton Percival, 21st century Saint Kitts and Nevis football manager

Fictional characters
 Tinny, nickname of Katrina Doyle, a character in Republic of Doyle, a Canadian television series
 Tinnie Tate, a recurring character in the Garrett P.I. fantasy novel series
 Tinny, a BotTot from the Kei'zatsu tribe in RollBots, a Canadian animated television series
 Tinny, a one-man band in the Toy Story plot draft; later changed to Buzz Lightyear

Places
 Tinnie, New Mexico, United States, an unincorporated community

See also

Tinne (disambiguation)
Tinnaya (fem. of "Tinny") or Tinnoye (neut. of "Tinny"), a rural locality (a selo) in Olyokminsky District of the Sakha Republic, Russia

